= The Erosion of Childhood =

1992 book by Valerie Suransky

- Author: Valerie Polakow Suransky
- Subject: Early childhood education in the United States, sociology of education
- Publisher: University of Chicago Press
- Publication date: 1982
- Pages: 221

The Erosion of Childhood is a 1992 book about early childhood schooling in the United States by Valerie Polakow Suransky. It is based on a study of five nursery and preschools across social class lines. The book was published by University of Chicago Press.
